The 1980 Missouri lieutenant gubernatorial election was held on November 4, 1980. Democratic nominee Ken Rothman defeated Republican nominee Roy Blunt with 55.75% of the vote.

Primary elections
Primary elections were held on August 5, 1980.

Democratic primary

Candidates
Ken Rothman, Speaker of the Missouri House of Representatives
Ken Carnes
Mickey Owen, baseball player
William Roy Bean
Roy Smith

Results

General election

Candidates
Ken Rothman, Democratic
Roy Blunt, Republican

Results

References

1980
Gubernatorial
Missouri